William John McNee (born 28 April 1933) is a former Australian politician.

He was born in Wyalkatchem in Western Australia and was a farmer before entering politics. In 1983 he was elected to the Western Australian Legislative Assembly as the Liberal member for Mount Marshall. He was defeated in 1986 but returned in 1989 as the member for Moore. From 1990 to 1992 he was Shadow Minister for Transport and Fisheries and from 1992 to 1993 Shadow Minister for Water Resources; however, when the Liberal Party won government in 1993 he was demoted to Parliamentary Secretary assisting in Water Resources and Local Government, serving until 1997. He retired in 2005.

References

1933 births
Living people
Liberal Party of Australia members of the Parliament of Western Australia
Members of the Western Australian Legislative Assembly
People from Wyalkatchem, Western Australia
21st-century Australian politicians